Ryota Kano (born 10 May 1992) is a Japanese rugby sevens player. He competed in the men's tournament at the 2020 Summer Olympics.

References

External links
 

1992 births
Living people
Male rugby sevens players
Olympic rugby sevens players of Japan
Rugby sevens players at the 2020 Summer Olympics
Sportspeople from Tokyo
Asian Games medalists in rugby union
Rugby union players at the 2018 Asian Games
Asian Games silver medalists for Japan
Medalists at the 2018 Asian Games